Native Jetty Bridge, also known as Napier Mole Bridge, is a bridge located in Karachi, Sindh which connects the city with the Port of Karachi. It is one of the oldest bridges in Karachi.

History
The modern port started its operations in 1854 during the British Raj, when a mole was constructed to connect city to the harbour. After few years Native Jetty Bridge was built with other important bridges in the area. Due to increased traffic congestion, a new wider bridge, Jinnah Bridge, was constructed and replaced the old one. 

Today, the old bridge has been converted to a Food Street and named as Port Grand Food and Entertainment Complex.

See also
Karachi Port Trust

References

Bridges in Karachi
1854 establishments in British India